Gaius Julius Verus Maximus (217/220 – May 238) was the son of the Roman Emperor Maximinus Thrax and his wife, Caecilia Paulina.

Biography
The unreliable Historia Augusta claims that emperor Severus Alexander considered marrying his sister Theoclia to Maximus but declined because he believed his sister would not enjoy having a Barbarian for a father-in-law.

Maximinus appointed his son Maximus Caesar around 236, but he held little real power. Both were murdered by the Praetorian Guard in May 238, during the Siege of Aquileia in the Year of the Six Emperors.

Notes

References

External links

 Historia Augusta (scroll down to "Maximinus the Younger")

3rd-century births
238 deaths
Crisis of the Third Century
3rd-century Romans
Julii
Caesars (heirs apparent)
Sons of Roman emperors
Heirs apparent who never acceded